Double Patty is a 2021 South Korean drama film directed by Baek Seung-hwan. The film stars Shin Seung-ho and Bae Joo-hyun.

Synopsis 
Kang Woo Ram (Shin Seung-ho), a foodie and a struggling athlete busy preparing to get a job. Lee Hyun Ji (Bae Ju-hyun) is a would-be anchor but works at a homemade hamburger restaurant called Burger from Heaven. 

Kang Woo Ram is a successful wrestler who has a good bond with his coach and fellow wrestlers. One of the wrestlers becomes his arch-rival and his coach later becomes sick. Unhappy with the turn of events, Kang Woo Ram gives up on wrestling and moves away from the city to a far-off town where he takes on the job of a bouncer at a gay bar called Tracks. His bar owner has got a loan to be collected and assigns that job to Kang Woo Ram, who collects the money after easily disposing off all the goons of the guy who owes money. With their pride hurt, the goons come back and ambush Kang Woo Ram and whack him severely on the back of his head. 

Although the injuries are not severe, it serves as a wake-up call for Kang Woo Ram to realise that this gig is not for him. Dazed from the attack, he drifts into Burger from Heaven restaurant and there he meets waitress Lee Hyun Ji. Smitten by her, he orders the buy one get one free Double Patty burgers. With the pretext of ordering those burgers, Kang Woo Ram heads there every night but can't sum up the courage to speak to her. Lee Hyun Ji notices his interest in her but she is also shy enough not to express her interest in him. They observe each other every night whenever Woo Ram is there but dare not to ruin the moment. During this time, Woo Ram observes how hard Hyun Ji is studying while working at the restaurant and starts respecting her. 

One night, Kang Woo Ram gets the news that his coach passed away and the funeral would be arranged in a couple of days. Depressed, he drinks down his sorrows and heads to Burger from Heaven to see Lee Hyun Ji as usual but he winds bashing his head into the wall due to the stupor. Hyun Ji pities him and takes him out as she knows who Woo Ram is and what he is going through. They head back to her home and she encourages him to face the demons of his past by expressing that she would also come along with him if he attends the funeral. 

Motivated, Woo Ram goes back to the city and attends the funeral. There, he regains the motivation to become a wrestler again after Hyun Ji motivates him further and tells him not to stress up too much. Both of them embark on realising their individual dreams and they slog hard. Hyun Ji takes multiple exams and gives various screen tests. There Hyun Ji speaks from her heart and impresses the judges. Simultaneously, Woo Ram defeats the various wrestlers at the lightweight wrestling championship and heads to the finals which pits him against his arch-rival. Despite his best efforts, Woo Ram looses the fight and on the other end, Hyun Ji gets selected for the final round. After impressing the judges in the final round, Hyun Ji sees a news report which shows that Woo Ram and his arch-rival are going to spar once more to settle their feud once and for all. Hyun Ji arrives just in time to witness the final round. Seeing his girlfriend cheering for him, Woo Ram gets motivated and defeats his arch-rival in a thumping victory. Both of them smile at each other very lovingly as the screen fades to black. 

It is later shown that Hyun Ji is now a successful field reporter and Woo Ram has been called by Korean military for the mandatory service. At the army base, Woo Ram's superiors get the word that someone is eating 2 double-patty burgers and they wonder who has that capacity to down so much of food. While listening to his superiors gawk at that, Woo Ram quietly smiles as he watches Hyun Ji's news report on the TV indicating that the couple is going strong.

Cast
 Shin Seung-ho as Kang Woo-ram
 Bae Joo-hyun as Lee Hyun-ji
 Song Ji-in as Choi Se-young
 Lee Byung-soo as Hwang Se-joon
 Yoo Byung-hoon as Coach Go
 Lee ji-hyun as Kang ji-hyun
 Heo Nam-joon as Han Sang-wook
 Baek Joo-hwan as Kiho
 Kwak Min-seok as Choi Gu-cheol
 Jo Dal-hwan as Il-woo
 Min Seung-wook as Sung-hwan
 Jung Young-joo as Moon Hee-jung
 Clara Lee as foreign journalist

References

External links 
 
 

2021 drama films
2020s Korean-language films
South Korean sports drama films
Films about journalists
Films about sportspeople
Ssireum films
Films set in restaurants
Films set in Seoul
Films set in South Jeolla Province